Kosesari is a village in the Palghar district of Maharashtra, India. It is located in the Dahanu taluka. It is in rural part of Palghar, and it is one of the 173 villages of Dahanu Block of Palghar district.

Demographics 

According to the 2011 census of India, Kosesari has 216 households. The effective literacy rate (i.e. the literacy rate of population excluding children aged 6 and below) is 32.9%.

References 

Villages in Dahanu taluka